Raupunga is a small settlement in the northern Hawke's Bay Region of New Zealand's eastern North Island. It is located close to the country's highest railway bridge, the Mohaka Viaduct, which crosses the Mohaka River. The predominantly Māori village is expected to have a population of 266 people by 2033.

The village got running water for the first time in 2017, when a 9 kilometre electric pump system was built from Mangawharangi Stream for $1 million. Until that time, many of the 56 households had got water from buckets.

Demographics

Maungataniwha-Raupunga had a population of 1,188 at the 2018 New Zealand census, an increase of 21 people (1.8%) since the 2013 census, and a decrease of 54 people (−4.3%) since the 2006 census. There were 405 households, comprising 624 males and 564 females, giving a sex ratio of 1.11 males per female. The median age was 35.0 years (compared with 37.4 years nationally), with 309 people (26.0%) aged under 15 years, 228 (19.2%) aged 15 to 29, 501 (42.2%) aged 30 to 64, and 147 (12.4%) aged 65 or older.

Ethnicities were 50.8% European/Pākehā, 63.1% Māori, 4.5% Pacific peoples, 0.8% Asian, and 1.0% other ethnicities. People may identify with more than one ethnicity.

The percentage of people born overseas was 5.3, compared with 27.1% nationally.

Although some people chose not to answer the census's question about religious affiliation, 39.1% had no religion, 40.4% were Christian, 11.6% had Māori religious beliefs and 1.0% had other religions.

Of those at least 15 years old, 72 (8.2%) people had a bachelor's or higher degree, and 222 (25.3%) people had no formal qualifications. The median income was $25,000, compared with $31,800 nationally. 84 people (9.6%) earned over $70,000 compared to 17.2% nationally. The employment status of those at least 15 was that 426 (48.5%) people were employed full-time, 138 (15.7%) were part-time, and 57 (6.5%) were unemployed.

Marae

Raupunga includes a number of marae (meeting grounds) and wharenui (meeting houses) for the local iwi (tribe) of Ngāti Kahungunu and its hapū (sub-tribes):

 Kurahikakawa Marae, affiliated with Ngāti Pāhauwera hapū, and Ngāti Pāhauwera iwi.
 Rangiāhua marae and Te Poho o Tamaterangi wharenui, affiliated with Ngāi Tamaterangi hapū.
 Raupunga Marae and Te Huki wharenui, affiliated with Ngāti Pāhauwera hapū.

In October 2020, the Government committed $1,949,075 from the Provincial Growth Fund to upgrade Rangiāhua, Raupunga and 22 other Ngāti Kahungunu marae. The funding was expected to create 164 jobs.

References

Wairoa District
Populated places in the Hawke's Bay Region